The 2000 season was Santos Futebol Clube's eighty-eighth in existence and the club's forty-first consecutive season in the top flight of Brazilian football.

Players

Squad

Source: Acervo Santista

Statistics

Appearances and goals

Source: Match reports in Competitive matches

Goalscorers

Source: Match reports in Competitive matches

Transfers

In

Out

Friendlies

Competitions

Overall summary

Copa João Havelange

Results summary

First stage

Group Blue

Matches

Copa do Brasil

Second round

Third round

Round of 16

Quarter-finals

Semi-finals

Campeonato Paulista

Second stage

League table

Matches

Third stage

League table

Matches

Knockout stage

Semi-finals

Final

Torneiro Rio-São Paulo

Group stage

Matches

References

External links
2000 season at Acervo Santista 

2000
Santos F.C.